A grooming dance, grooming invitation dance or shaking dance is a dance performed by honeybees to initiate allogrooming.  It was first reported in 1945 by biologist Mykola H. Hadak.   An increase in the frequency of the grooming dance has been observed among the bees of mite-infested colonies, and among bees who have been dusted with small particles of chalk dust.

See also 
Bee learning and communication
Tremble dance
Waggle dance

References 

Animal communication
Western honey bee behavior
Neuroethology